Prabir Kumar Sandell (born 18 February 1934) is  the Chairman of Eltech Group of Companies, member governing  body of electronic skill sector council, Government of India, and management committee members of Associated Chamber of Commerce and Industry(Assocham) in India, and Chairman of the Chamber's national council on yoga and meditation.

Early and personal life
Prabir was born in Kolkatta, India, on 18 February 1934 in the Sandell family.   He had his earlier education in Rabindranath Tagore institution, Viswabharati, and St. Xavier's School and College in Kolkatta, West Bengal. After graduating with physics honors, he completed his M.Sc. (tech) degree and published 3 research notes in nuclear physics in Indian Journal of Physics. Subsequently, he obtained his Ph.D. degree in international management and also was awarded a diploma in marketing from Bombay University.

Career
Sandell was in Philips India Lt., a subsidiary of the international Philips group, from 1956 to 1972 as a manager of the scientific and professional electronic division, and in this role, he drove the first ever manufacturing in India of electronic instruments and professional electronic equipment in Bombay, Pune, and Kolkatta. Subsequently, from 1972 to 1982, as general manager of communication division of Tata group's Forbes company and as managing director of Uptron Electronics, a UP state government company, he led the manufacturing of power electronics equipment in India. Subsequently, at the invitation of the government of India, he joined E.T.&T as managing director of electronics trade and technology development company of the government of India.

As chairman of ET&T, Sandell developed the concept of using low power terrestrial transmission technology by using S-Band transmission satellite transducers and large parabolic dishes at reception centers in cities spread throughout India. This proposal resulted in lower cost (about Rupees 25 lacs per system) compared to the alternative solution of using high power systems proposed by Doordarshan, the government's official TV authority. This was operational across 20 cities within 9 months as against 2 years required by Doordarshan engineers. Sandell was also the first to drive the indigenous manufacturing of O.B. color TV vans for outdoor coverage of TV events.  He also facilitated the training of local manufacturers of color TV sets and other peripherals such as antennae. As a result of these efforts, all these methods and designs for color TV manufacturing and transmission were standardized by the government of India.

Subsequently, as a member of UNIDO, Sandell created the Institute of Small Scale Electronics Production in Bandung, Indonesia in collaboration with National Electronics Laboratory of the Government of Indonesia.

Awards
Lifelong Award for Service to Small Scale IT Industry of India by Skoch Foundation, New Delhi
Award for Outstanding Management by Amity University, International Management Division
Award for Outstanding Export Performance to Sandell in his Role as chairman, Electronic and Software Export Promotion Council of India

References and Publications
Digital Divide by Dilip K. Ghosh
Rise and Decline of Telecommunication Revolution in India by Prabir K. Sandell and Dilip K. Ghosh
"Telecom Sector Is Undergoing Transition: Pitroda." The Hindu. N.p., 08 Apr. 2013. Web. 17 Aug. 2016.(http://www.thehindu.com/business/telecom-sector-is-undergoing-transition-pitroda/article4594550.ece)
Indian Journal of Physics
India's Who's Who - 1992: Page 393 (Google Books: https://books.google.com/books?id=8LQEAQAAIAAJ&dq=prabir%20sandell&source=gbs_book_other_versions)
THE  GREAT  DIGITAL  TRANSFORMATION  by Dr. D K Ghosh (pages 85–86)
http://articles.economictimes.indiatimes.com/2004-06-30/news/27393553_1_fiscal-incentives-esc-10a-and-10b
http://indiatoday.intoday.in/story/insat-a-damp-squib/1/391656.html
http://indiatoday.intoday.in/story/1982-Colour+television+is+introduced:+Out+of+the+dark+ages/1/76371.html

1934 births
Living people
Indian business executives